Marvin Olawale Akinlabi Park (born 3 July 2000), simply known as Marvin, is a Spanish professional footballer who plays as an attacking midfielder for Segunda División club Las Palmas, on loan from La Liga club Real Madrid.

Club career
Born in Palma de Mallorca, Balearic Islands, Marvin spent his early career with Sporting Ciutat de Palma (two stints), English club Tranmere Rovers, where he spent three years, and back in Spain with SD La Salle and AD Penya Arrabal before joining Real Madrid's La Fábrica in 2016. He made his senior debut with the reserves on 25 August 2019, coming on as a second-half substitute for Miguel Baeza in a 1–1 Segunda División B away draw against Las Rozas CF.

Marvin scored his first senior goal on 26 October 2019, netting the opener in a 1–2 home loss against Racing de Ferrol. He ended his first senior campaign with three goals in 26 appearances, as the season was curtailed by the COVID-19 pandemic, while also helping the under-20s win the UEFA Youth League.

Marvin made his first team – and La Liga – debut on 20 September 2020, replacing Rodrygo in a 0–0 away draw against Real Sociedad.

In August 2022, he was loaned to Las Palmas.

International career
Marvin was born in Spain to a Nigerian father and a South Korean mother. He represented the Spain U19s once in a friendly 3–0 loss against Italy U19s on 16 January 2019.

Career statistics

Club

Honours
Real Madrid (youth)
UEFA Youth League: 2019–20

References

External links
Real Madrid profile

2000 births
Living people
Footballers from Palma de Mallorca
Spanish footballers
Association football midfielders
La Liga players
Segunda División B players
Real Madrid Castilla footballers
Real Madrid CF players
UD Las Palmas players
Spain youth international footballers
Tranmere Rovers F.C. players
Spanish expatriate footballers
Spanish expatriate sportspeople in England
Expatriate footballers in England
Spanish people of Nigerian descent
Spanish sportspeople of African descent
Spanish people of South Korean descent
Spanish sportspeople of Asian descent
Sportspeople of Korean descent
Primera Federación players